Manuel Cisneros Sánchez (1 November 1904 – 14 September 1971) served as Prime Minister of Peru for two terms and also initiated the Pradist Democratic Movement.

References 

Prime Ministers of Peru
Grand Crosses 1st class of the Order of Merit of the Federal Republic of Germany
1904 births
1971 deaths
Peruvian Democratic Movement politicians